Links to Temptation (Traditional Chinese: 誘情轉駁) is a 2010 Hong Kong modern suspense drama starring Steven Ma, Yoyo Mung, Fala Chen and Kenny Wong.

Synopsis
Kwan Ho-Chin (Yoyo Mung) is the daughter of rich businessman Ko Wing-Tai (Lau Tan), Ko not only abandoned the unborn Kwan and her mother in Macao but stole her mother's life savings to begin his business empire. Years later in Hong Kong Kwan plots revenge, and hires Macao pole dancer Hung Long-Kiu (Fala Chen) to seduce Ko with the aim of pretending that Hung is Ko's daughter once they have become lovers.

Ko is prevented from consummating his relationship with Hung, but is fooled into thinking that Hung is indeed his long lost daughter. With her plan to convince Ko that he has committed incest foiled, Kwan instead sets her sights on Ko's fortune, and asks Hung to play along with Ko's misconception. Ko treats Hung as his own flesh and blood and tries to make amends for being an absent father, rewriting his will to favour Hung over his own son.

Shing Wai-shun (Steven Ma) is a barrister in love with Hung since a chance encounter in Macao. At times thinking that she is an innocent victim and at times a mercenary opportunist. They become a couple but when Ko and Kwan die in quick succession the finger of suspicion points to Hung, Shing must defend his loved one in court, but even he must ask himself did Hung kill Ko and then Kwan for her inheritance.

Cast and characters

Kwan Family

Shing Family

Ko Family

Other cast

Viewership ratings

Awards and nominations

45th TVB Anniversary Awards 2011
 Nominated: Best Drama
 Nominated: Best Supporting Actor (Kenny Wong)

References

External links
TVB.com Links to Temptation - Official Website 

TVB dramas
2010 Hong Kong television series debuts
2011 Hong Kong television series endings